Võru JK was an Estonian football club based in Võru. The club was founded in 2001 and was dissolved in the end 2016 when the team merged into Võru FC Helios. The team last played in the II Liiga, the third highest level of Estonian football.

Statistics

League and Cup

References

Võru JK at Estonian Football Association

External links
Official homepage 

Defunct football clubs in Estonia
Association football clubs established in 2001
Sport in Võru
2001 establishments in Estonia
2016 disestablishments in Estonia
Association football clubs disestablished in 2016